Topolyovsky is a rural locality (a khutor) in Dobrinskoye Rural Settlement, Uryupinsky District, Volgograd Oblast, Russia. The population was 10 as of 2010.

Geography 
Topolyovsky is located in steppe, 24 km northwest of Uryupinsk (the district's administrative centre) by road. Zaburdyayevsky is the nearest rural locality.

References 

Rural localities in Uryupinsky District